Expedition 66 was the 66th long-duration expedition to the International Space Station. The mission began after the departure of Soyuz MS-18 on 17 October 2021. It was commanded by European Space Agency astronaut Thomas Pesquet, the fourth European astronaut to command the ISS and first French astronaut to command the orbital laboratory, until 8 November 2021, when Russian cosmonaut Anton Shkaplerov, who arrived aboard Soyuz MS-19, and took over his command.

Pesquet was transported to the ISS on SpaceX Crew-2 in April 2021, joined by NASA astronauts Shane Kimbrough and Megan McArthur and Japan Aerospace Exploration Agency (JAXA) astronaut Akihiko Hoshide. Crew-2 from Expedition 65 extended their tour of duty on the ISS to become part of Expedition 66, along with Russian cosmonaut Pyotr Dubrov and NASA astronaut Mark Vande Hei, who both launched on Soyuz MS-18 and will return to Earth on Soyuz MS-19, following their extended mission. Russian cosmonaut Shkaplerov launched on Soyuz MS-19, along with two participants in the joint film project between Roscosmos and Channel One, The Challenge: film director Klim Shipenko and actress Yulia Peresild.

SpaceX Crew-3, launched 10 November 2021, carried NASA astronauts Raja Chari, Thomas Marshburn, and Kayla Barron and ESA astronaut Matthias Maurer to the ISS. At the end of Expedition 66, they remained on the ISS as part of Expedition 67 while Dubrov and Vande Hei returned to Earth aboard Soyuz MS-19. However, continued international collaboration has been thrown into doubt by the 2022 Russian invasion of Ukraine and related sanctions on Russia.

Crew

Notes

References 

Expeditions to the International Space Station
2021 in spaceflight
2022 in spaceflight